Granulina occulta is a species of very small sea snail, a marine gastropod mollusk or micromollusk in the family Granulinidae.

Description

Distribution
This species occurs in the Atlantic Ocean off Morocco.

References

 Monterosato T. A. (di) (1869 (15 ottobre)). Testacei nuovi dei mari di Sicilia. Palermo 18 pp + 1 tav
 Boyer F., Renda W. & Öztürk B. (2020). The genus Granulina (Mollusca: Gastropoda: Neogastropoda) from the Turkish coasts with taxonomical notes on some Mediterranean species. Ege Journal of Fisheries and Aquatic Sciences. 37(1): 65–83

External links
 Locard, A. (1897–1898). Expéditions scientifiques du Travailleur et du Talisman pendant les années 1880, 1881, 1882 et 1883. Mollusques testacés. Paris, Masson. vol. 1 [1897], pp. 1–516 pl. 1–22; vol. 2 [1898], pp. 1–515, pl. 1–18
 Sturany, R. (1896). Zoologische Ergebnisse VII. Mollusken I (Prosobranchier und Opisthobranchier; Scaphopoden; Lamellibranchier) gesammelt von S.M. Schiff "Pola" 1890-1894. Denkschriften der Kaiserlichen Akademie der Wissenschaften, Mathematische-Naturwissenschaftlischen Classe. 63: 1–36, pl. 1–2
  Gofas S. (1992) Le genre Granulina (Marginellidae) en Méditerranée et dans l'Atlantique oriental. Bollettino Malacologico 28(1-4): 1–26

Granulinidae
Gastropods described in 1869